The AAA World Mini-Estrella Championship (Campeonato Mundial Mini AAA in Spanish) is a professional wrestling championship promoted by the Mexican Lucha Libre promotion Lucha Libre AAA Worldwide (AAA). The championship is exclusively competed for in the Mini-Estrellas, or Minis, division. A "Mini" is not necessarily a person with dwarfism like North American Midget wrestling, it can also be very short wrestlers who works in the Mini division. The Championship was created in 2008 after Mascarita Sagrada left AAA, taking the Mexican National Mini-Estrella Championship with him, leaving AAA without a title for their Mini-Estrellas division. Being a professional wrestling championship it is not won legitimately; it is instead won via a scripted ending to a match.

History
The AAA World Mini-Estrella Championship was created in 2008 as the focal point of AAA's Mini-Estrellas division. The first champion was Mini Charly Manson who won a Mini-Estrella Championship tournament when he defeated Mini Abismo Negro and Octagoncito in the finals of the tournament that took place at the 2008 Verano de Escándalo show on September 14, 2008. Mini Charly Manson did not defend the title for over a year, mainly due to suffering two separate injuries that put him on the disabled list for most of the year.

The inaugural champion was Mini Charly Manson, who defeated Mini Abismo Negro and Octagoncito at Verano de Escándalo on September 14, 2008 in Zapopan, Jalisco. The longest reigning champion was Dinastia, who held the title for 1,558 days from February 18, 2013 to May 26, 2017. The youngest champion was Mini Charly Manson, who won at the age of 21 years and 67 days. The shortest reigning champion was Mini Abismo Negro who held the title for 177 days from December 11, 2009 to June 6, 2010. The oldest champion is Mini Psicosis who won at the age of 44 years and 334 days. The current champion is Dinastía, who is in his second reign. He defeated Mini Psycho Clown for the championship on March 17, 2019  in Mexico City, Mexico.

Title tournament
The tournament to crown the first ever AAA World Mini-Estrellas champion ran from July 20, 2008 until September 14, 2008 with the finals at the 2008 Verano de Escándalo event. The tournament featured 12 wrestlers who wrestled in regular singles matches until the final which was a three-way match. The first two matches took place on July 20, 2009 and saw Mascarita Sagrada defeat Mini Histeria and Mini Abismo Negro defeat La Parkita to qualify for the semi-final. The tournament continued on July 25, 2008 where Octagoncito defeated Mini Chessman and Atomic Boy defeated Mascarita de la Muerte. On July 31, 2008 Mini Charly Manson defeated Jerrito Estrada in the opening round and on August 8, 2008 Mini Kenzo Suzuki defeated Mascarita Divina to be the last wrestler to qualify for the semi-finals. Octagoncito was the first to qualify for the finals as he defeated Mini Kenzo Suzuki on August 15, 2009. Mini Charly Manson defeated Mascarita Sagrada on August 17, 2008 to become the second to qualify for the final. Mini Abismo Negro was the last to qualify, defeating Atomic Boy on August 31, 2009. The final match saw Mini Charly Manson outlast Octagoncito and Mini Abismo Negro to become the first AAA World Mini-Estrellas Champion.

Reigns

Combined reigns

References

External links
AAA's official title history

Lucha Libre AAA Worldwide championships
World professional wrestling championships
Midget wrestling championships